Boneh-ye Sorkhi (also Romanized as Boneh-ye Sorkhī; also known as Boneh-ye Sorkh and Shīrīn Āb) is a village in Dasht-e Lali Rural District, in the Central District of Lali County, Khuzestan Province, Iran. At the 2006 census, its population was 615, in 108 families.

References 

Populated places in Lali County